Dobrin may refer to:

Dobrin (name)
Dobříň, a village and municipality (obec) in Litoměřice District, Ústí nad Labem Region, Czech Republic
Dobrin, Sălaj, commune in Sălaj County, Romania
Dobrin, Bulgaria, a village in Dobrich Province, Bulgaria
The Dobrin Wind Farm, Dobrin, Dobrich Region, Bulgaria
Dobrin, German name for a town in the Kuyavian-Pomeranian Voivodeship, Poland

See also
 Dobrzyń (disambiguation)
 Dobre (disambiguation)